Kimberley Jennifer Garth (born 25 April 1996) is an Irish-Australian cricketer who currently plays for Victoria, Melbourne Stars and Australia. An all-rounder, she plays as a right-arm medium bowler and right-handed batter. Between 2010 and 2019, she played international cricket for Ireland, the country of her birth, playing more than 100 matches for the side, before deciding to move to Australia. She made her international debut for Australia in December 2022.

Biography
Born in Dublin, Garth is the daughter of Jonathan Garth and Anne-Marie McDonald, both of whom also played for Ireland. Her father was born in South Africa. Garth herself made her international debut in July 2010, in a one-off ODI against New Zealand. On debut, she was 14 years and 70 days old, making her the youngest Irishwoman to debut and the third-youngest overall (behind Pakistan's Sajjida Shah and Scotland's Fiona Urquhart). Several others have since debuted at younger ages.

Garth went on to play six more ODIs in 2010, including at the 2010 ICC Women's Challenge in South Africa. That competition featured both 50-over and 20-over components, with Garth making her Twenty20 International debut in the latter, against Pakistan. Aged 14 years and 174 days, she became the youngest player of any country to appear in that format, beating the record set by the Netherlands' Miranda Veringmeier. Three of her Irish teammates – Elena Tice, Lucy O'Reilly, and Gaby Lewis – have since debuted at younger ages.

Since making her debut, Garth has been a regular for Ireland at both ODI and T20I level. In ODIs, her most outstanding performance to date came in August 2012, when she took 4/11 from five overs against Bangladesh (including the first four wickets to fall). Her highest score at that level was made during the same month, an innings of 39 runs against Pakistan. In Twenty20 Internationals, Garth has taken two three-wicket hauls – 3/6 against the Netherlands in August 2011, and 3/17 against Australia in August 2015.

In November 2015, Garth was named International Women's Player of the Year at the Cricket Ireland Awards.

In June 2018, she was named in Ireland's squad for the 2018 ICC Women's World Twenty20 Qualifier tournament. In October 2018, she was named in Ireland's squad for the 2018 ICC Women's World Twenty20 tournament in the West Indies. In Ireland's opening match of the tournament, against Australia, she made her 100th international appearance for the team. Following the conclusion of the tournament, she was named as the standout player in the team by the International Cricket Council (ICC).

In August 2019, she was named in Ireland's squad for the 2019 ICC Women's World Twenty20 Qualifier tournament in Scotland. She was the leading run-scorer for Ireland in the tournament, with 100 runs in five matches.

In June 2020, Garth accepted a two-year contract with the Victoria women's cricket team in Australia. She made her debut for Victoria in a Women's National Cricket League match in February 2021, taking 2-25 from 8.2 overs to help her new team to an eight-wicket win over arch-rivals New South Wales. Ahead of the 2020–21 season, she spent the Australian winter working with former Australia paceman Clint McKay on enhancing her game, and was then signed by Melbourne Stars. In the early stages of WBBL07, she showcased her recently augmented skills by taking a match-winning 3–11 against Sydney Thunder, and then scoring 44* from 29 deliveries against Hobart Hurricanes the following day.

On 9 December 2022, she made her international debut for Australia, in a Twenty20 International against India.

References

External links

Kim Garth at Cricket Australia
 Shaped by the past, Kim Garth looks ahead to bright future – profile in Wisden India

1996 births
Living people
Ireland women One Day International cricketers
Ireland women Twenty20 International cricketers
Australia women Twenty20 International cricketers
Irish people of South African descent
Irish women cricketers
Cricketers from County Dublin
Irish emigrants to Australia
Australian people of Irish descent
Australian women cricketers
Melbourne Stars (WBBL) cricketers
Perth Scorchers (WBBL) cricketers
Sydney Sixers (WBBL) cricketers
Victoria women cricketers
Scorchers (women's cricket) cricketers
Dragons (women's cricket) cricketers
Gujarat Giants (WPL) cricketers
Dual international cricketers